Alex Davies (born 27 July 1987) is an English former professional snooker player from Holland-on-Sea in Essex. He is the youngest person ever to win the English Amateur Championship, in 2003. Davies began his professional career by playing Challenge Tour in 2003, at the time the second-level professional tour. Davies was on the WPBSA Main Tour for the 2007–08 season, but dropped off. In May 2013, he returned to the main tour by winning five matches at the Q School event one concluding with a 4–1 win over Mitchell Travis to earn a place on the tour for the 2013–14 and 2014–15 season.

Career

2013/2014 season
Davies made a dream start to the season as in his first match he defeated world number four Shaun Murphy 5–1 to qualify for the 2013 Wuxi Classic in China where he lost 5–2 to Joel Walker in the first round. He also qualified for the Indian Open, International Championship and World Open, but lost in the first round of each. He finished his first year on the main snooker tour ranked world number 96.

2014/2015 season
Davies recorded wins over Mitchell Mann, Peter Lines and Anthony McGill in the qualifying rounds of the Shanghai Masters, but was then beaten 5–2 by Liang Wenbo in the final round. He lost 6–4 to Aditya Mehta and 4–0 to Mark Selby in the opening round of the UK Championship and Welsh Open. Davies defeated Tom Ford 5–3 to reach the China Open, but was thrashed 5–0 by Zhao Xintong in the wildcard round. He could not pick up any wins on the European Tour until the last two events where a pair of last 32 exits saw him finish 72nd on the Order of Merit. Davies dropped off the tour at the end of the season as, at 76th in the world rankings, he is outside the top 64. Davies entered Q School in a bid to regain his place and came within two matches of doing so in the first event, but lost 4–1 to Leo Fernandez. In the second event, Davies was eliminated 4–1 by Duane Jones in the opening round.

Q School
Davies again entered Q School, but only won two matches across the two events to fall short of gaining a tour card.
In the second event of 2017 Q School he stood one win away from regaining a spot back on the tour, but was beaten 4–2 by Duane Jones.

Performance and rankings timeline

References

External links

Alex Davies at worldsnooker.com

1987 births
Living people
English snooker players
People from Tendring (district)
Sportspeople from Essex